Nicolas Pleimling (born 15 December 1938) is a former Luxembourgian cyclist. He competed in the team time trial at the 1960 Summer Olympics.

References

External links
 

1938 births
Living people
Luxembourgian male cyclists
Olympic cyclists of Luxembourg
Cyclists at the 1960 Summer Olympics
Sportspeople from Luxembourg City